The Poacher of the Silver Wood is a 1957 West German drama film directed by Otto Meyer and starring Rudolf Lenz, Anita Gutwell and Rudolf Carl. It was one of several films made to follow-up the success of the 1954 heimatfilm The Forester of the Silver Wood.

It was shot on location in the Alpine state of Salzburg.

Cast
 Rudolf Lenz as Christian Pachegg
 Anita Gutwell as Ulli
 Rudolf Carl as Mathias Hoellrigl
 Lucie Englisch as Mathilde Hoellrigl
 Traute Wassler as Josefa Rohrer
 Brigitte Antonius
 Emmerich Schrenk
 Fritz Muliar
 Wolfgang Jansen
 Harry Kratz
 Walter Varndal
 Heinrich Fuchs
 Ludwig Geiger
 Vera Complojer

References

Bibliography 
 Baer, Hester. Dismantling the Dream Factory: Gender, German Cinema, and the Postwar Quest for a New Film Language. Berghahn Books, 2012.

External links 
 

1957 films
West German films
German drama films
1957 drama films
1950s German-language films
Films directed by Otto Meyer
Films set in the Alps
Films about hunters
Films set in forests
1950s German films